Theodolite Hill is a hill, 680 m, with a small rock outcrop at its summit, standing at the southeast corner of Laclavère Plateau 5 nautical miles (9 km) west of the northwest end of Duse Bay, in the northeast part of Trinity Peninsula. Discovered by the Falkland Islands Dependencies Survey (FIDS), 1946, and so named during their survey of the area because it served as an important theodolite station.

Map
 Trinity Peninsula. Scale 1:250000 topographic map No. 5697. Institut für Angewandte Geodäsie and British Antarctic Survey, 1996.

See also 
 Boil Point

External links 

 Theodolite Hill Copernix satellite image

Hills of Trinity Peninsula